The Group of Five (G5) encompasses five nations which have joined together for an active role in the rapidly evolving international order. Individually and as a group, the G5 nations work to promote dialogue and understanding between developing and developed countries.  The G5 seek to find common solutions to global challenges. In the 21st century, the G5 were understood to be the five largest emerging economies

The G8 plus the five largest emerging economies has come to be known as G8+5.

History
The Group of Five is a context-dependent shorthand term for a group of five nations.  The composition of the five and what is encompassed by the term is construed differently in different time frames.  Initially, the term "Group of Five" or "G5" encompassed the five leading economies of the world, but the use of the term changed over time. Nowadays, the term tends to describe the next tier of nations whose economies had expanded so substantially as to be construed in the same category as the world's eight major industrialized countries.

20th century
The concept of a forum for the world's major industrialized democracies emerged following the 1973 oil crisis and subsequent global recession. In 1974 the United States created the informal Library Group, an unofficial gathering of senior financial officials from France, Japan, the United Kingdom, the United States, and West Germany. These men were called the "Library Group" because they met informally in the library of the White House in Washington, D.C.

During the 1970s, the term Group of Five came to be identified the top five of the world's the leading economies as ranked by per capita GDP. Without the informal meetings of the G5 finance ministers, there would have been no subsequent meetings of G-5 leaders. In 1975, French President Valéry Giscard d'Estaing invited five other heads of government from Italy, Japan, the United Kingdom, the United States, and West Germany to a six-party economic summit in Château de Rambouillet. At the time, it was impossible to predict whether this informal gathering would be meaningful or only a public relations event.

In subsequent years, the group of world leaders expanded to reflect changed economic and political developments:

 1975 — the Group of Six (G6)
 1976 — the Group of Seven (G7) was created when Canada joined the G6
 1997 — the Group of Eight (G8) was formed when Russia joined the G7

21st century
An innovation at the Gleneagles G8 summit in 2005 was an "outreach dialogue."  The United Kingdom was host for the annual summit of G8 leaders; and the UK invited the leaders of Brazil, China, India, Mexico, and South Africa to participate. The invitation caused the five countries  to negotiate amongst themselves about presenting common positions.

The success of this collaboration led to the growth of the G5 as an independent voice.  The G5 expresses common interests and viewpoints in the search of solutions to major global issues.

A number of cohesive elements bind the G5 together in promoting a constructive dialogue between developed and developing countries.

Structure and activities
The G5 is an informal group for discussions involving an intentional community or an epistemic community.  The G5 membership is marked by a range of attributes and factors, including

(a) a shared set of normative and principled beliefs, which provide a value-based rationale for the social action of community members;

(b) shared causal beliefs, which are derived from their analysis of practices leading or contributing to a central set of problems in their domain and which then serve as the basis for elucidating the multiple linkages between possible policy actions and desired outcomes;

(c) shared notions of validity — that is, intersubjective, internally defined criteria for weighing and validating knowledge in the domain of their expertise; and

(d) a common policy enterprise—that is, a set of common practices associated with a set of problems to which their group competence is directed.

By design, the G5 has avoided establishing an administrative structure like those of other international organizations, but a coordinator has been designated to help improve the G5's effectiveness.

Current leaders

See also
BRICS
Group of Seven (G7)
Group of 15 (G15)
G-20 major economies

Notes

References

 Bayne, Nicholas and Robert D. Putnam. (2000).  Hanging in There: The G7 and G8 Summit in Maturity and Renewal. Aldershot, Hampshire, England: Ashgate Publishing. ; OCLC 43186692
 Reinalda, Bob and Bertjan Verbeek. (1998).  Autonomous Policy Making by International Organizations. London: Routledge. 	; ;;   OCLC 39013643

Intergovernmental organizations
Organizations established in 2005
2005 in international relations